The Ohio Valley Conference Men's Basketball Player of the Year is an annual basketball award given to the Ohio Valley Conference's (OVC) most outstanding player. The award was first given following the 1962–63 season.

Fifteen players in OVC history have claimed more than one player of the year award, the most recent of whom was Terry Taylor in 2020 and 2021. Among the repeat winners, only one—Clem Haskins of Western Kentucky—has been a three-time player of the year. Haskins achieved the feat from 1965 through 1967.

Both of the schools with the most awards left the OVC in 2022. Murray State, which has dominated the award's selection, with its players having received the award 21 times (which at the Racers' departure was equal to the total of the next three programs on the list), joined the Missouri Valley Conference. Second-place Austin Peay, with eight awards, joined the ASUN Conference. Among schools remaining in the OVC after 2022, Morehead State has the most awards with seven. Four current OVC members have yet to produce a winner, but three (Lindenwood, Little Rock, Southern Indiana) played their first OVC seasons in 2022–23; the only pre-2022 member without a winner is SIU Edwardsville.

Four ties have occurred for player of the year: 1968, 1976, 1983 and 2013. No OVC Men's Basketball Player of the Year has ever been selected as any national player of the year.

Key

Winners

Winners by school

Footnotes

References

 

NCAA Division I men's basketball conference players of the year
Player
Awards established in 1963